Solo Launcher 
is a free launcher for Android-compatible smartphones and tablets, serving as a replacement for the existing home screen and is responsible for starting other applications and hosting widgets. The app first released in March of 2014 and was most recently updated on May 13, 2015. Solo Launcher was introduced at the Yahoo MDC as a Typical Case integrated with Yahoo Search and was built to integrate with Android. KitKat Holo Light UI. It enables the user to personalize over 300 settings and over 5,000 themes to choose from, live wallpapers, lock screens, and fonts. Solo Launcher was developed by NewBornTown.
With over 100 million users worldwide, Solo Launcher is one of the Top 3 Launchers in its category on Google Play. It allows users to customize the interface on a device.

Features

Unread mail count
Gestures (nine kinds of complex gestures)
Quick start actions (for apps or widgets)
Unlimited custom groups in a drawer
App drawer tabs (for better organization)
Customized widgets for weather
Clock weather, battery saver, and task manager widgets
Compatible with themes of GO Launcher EX, Nova, ADW, Apex, Holo
App hiding
Seamless integration with Google services
Transition effects for home screen and app drawer
Customize desktop and app drawer columns and rows
Built-in Solo Launcher app store

See also
List of Android launchers
NewBornTown

References

External links
 

Android (operating system) software
Mobile application launchers